Marie-France van Helden (née Vives; born 30 September 1959) is a retired French speed skater. She competed at the 1988 Winter Olympics in 500 m and 3000 m and finished in 27th and 24th place, respectively. In 1980 she married Hans van Helden, a Dutch speed skater who later changed his nationality to French.

Personal bests: 
500 m – 42.49 (1988)
1000 m – 1:25.7 (1986)
1500 m – 2:11.64 (1986)
 3000 m – 4:32.44 (1988)
5000 m – 8:14.31 (1987)

References

External links
 Marie-France van Helden-Vives at speedskatingstats.com
 
 
 

1959 births
Living people
French female speed skaters
Olympic speed skaters of France
Speed skaters at the 1988 Winter Olympics